MTV-82 (with  standing for ) is a Soviet four-axle tramcar.

The first prototype of the MTV-82 tramcar was built at Military Factory No. 82 (from which the 82 in the model name is derived) in 1946. Mass production started in 1947 in Factory No. 82, and it was transferred to Rīgas Vagonbūves Rūpnīca (RVR) in 1949. In 1961 mass production of MTV-82 in Riga ceased, with production switching to its direct successor, the RVZ-6 tramcar.
In total, Factory No. 82 and RVR produced 453 and 1707 MTV-82s respectively.

These tramcars worked until 1983 in Moscow, Kiev, Gorky, Sverdlovsk, Vladivostok and many other Soviet cities and towns. The Soviet tram drivers and repairmen liked the MTV-82 very much for its simplicity, reliability and durability. Most MTV-82s were in operable state before scrapping, but renovation of Soviet trams was fatal for many types of "old-fashioned" Soviet tramcars (see also LM-49).

Technical details 
MTV-82 is a  gauge high-floor four-axle tram. It has a full metal body which is mounted on a massive steel carriage with two double-axle bogies. The car has two double doors at each end, which have pneumatic gear for opening and closing. The main brake system is also pneumatic. MTV-82 is equipped with four 55 kW electric motors and is capable of a maximum speed of 55 km/h. The controller for motors uses direct current. Initially the MTV-82 did not have a low-voltage system, but this was added later for external braking and turn light signalization. The vehicle has 40 seats and is able to transport nearly 120 passengers with a full load. The MTV-82 is 13611 mm in length, 2550 mm in width, and nearly 3000 mm in height. The overall weight without passengers is 17.5 metric tons.

History 
Shortly after the end of World War II a strong need in new trolleybuses became apparent. This was due to a massive conversion from trams to trolley buses in many cities in the USSR. Due to this issue, the Motor and Automobile Research Institute developed a unified vehicle bodies for buses and trolleybuses, which was a  copy of the ones produced by General Motors.
The production of such trolleybuses started in 1946. While the plant produced only 70 complete trolleybuses, the number of produced bodies was much higher. The plant did not have a sufficient number of motor and traction parts to use these bodies for trolleybuses. These trolleybus bodies simply were stored in plant warehouses.
In order to get out of this situation, Anton Ivanovich Livinenko, chief engineer of the Moscow Tram Council, suggested to use these bodies in tram production.  These bodies were converted into the trams very with help from the Transportation Overhaul Plant in Sokolniki. This re-engineering found to be very successful. In comparison with MTB-82 Trolleybus, the capacity was increased to 120, 55 of which were seated.
In early 1947 similarly with MTB-82 trolleybus, this model of tram became the MTV-82 tram.

MTV-82 in Non-Revenue Service 

The legendary endurance and reliability of MTV-82 trams makes them ideal for use in non-revenue service. After being retired or removed from passenger service, many MTV-82 trams were converted into service trams. They could be used for towing other trams, as hoppers, freight trams, etc. In the cities of Odessa, and Zaparozh'je a couple of MTV-82 trams were rebuilt into unique double ended (2 cab) version. In Odessa, such 2-cab trams were in use on the picturesque single track route #19. In Zaparozh'e they were used on route #5.

Survivors 

Three MTV-82s survive. Moscow and Ekaterinburg
have two operable MTV-82 in their tramway systems. Nizhny Novgorod tram & trolley museum has a third operable MTV-82 in its tramcar collection. These MTV-82s do not serve as usual tramcars, but can be hired for city excursions (but this is quite a long, formal and bureaucratic procedure in today's Russia). A group of tramway enthusiasts from many cities of Russia with guests from Estonia and United States hired Nizhny Novgorod Museum MTV-82 for their meeting in 2004.

Odessa Transport Authority found unique solutions to existing MTV tramcars in their possession. One of them is car #914, which was converted into an open "retro-style" excursion tram. Its design was modified to commemorate Pullmans of the early 20th century, along with historical dark-red livery.
Car #914 can be seen running both along the "excursion routes" and Route 5, the most picturesque tram route in Odessa.

See also 
 Tram
 Soviet Tramcar LM-49

References

External links 

  MTV-82 on Nizhny Novgorod TramSite 

Soviet tram vehicles